Pyrgomantis wellmanni is a species of praying mantis found in Angola. They have a green body with white & green wings.

See also
List of mantis genera and species

References

Pyrgomantis
Mantodea of Africa
Insects described in 1912